Ştefan Stănculescu ( 16 September 1923 – 4 October 2013) was a Romanian football coach.

Managerial career
Stănculescu was youth coach of Dinamo Bucharest from 1958 to 1974 He managed F.C. Aboomoslem an Iranian football club during the 1970s.

He also coached Zaire from 1974 to 1976.

References

1923 births
2013 deaths
Footballers from Bucharest
Romanian footballers
FC Sportul Studențesc București players
Unirea Tricolor București players
Faur București players
Romanian football managers
Romanian expatriate football managers
Democratic Republic of the Congo national football team managers
Expatriate football managers in the Democratic Republic of the Congo
Expatriate football managers in Iran
Romanian expatriate sportspeople in Iran
Romanian expatriate sportspeople in the Democratic Republic of the Congo
1976 African Cup of Nations managers
Association football goalkeepers